Khánh An may refer to:

Khánh An, An Giang, a rural commune of An Phú District
Khánh An, Cà Mau, a rural commune of U Minh District
 , a rural commune of Yên Khánh District